The Swing Bridge is a swing bridge over the River Tyne, England, connecting Newcastle upon Tyne and Gateshead, and lying between the Tyne Bridge and the High Level Bridge. It is a Grade II* listed structure.

History

The Swing Bridge stands on the site of the Old Tyne Bridges of 1270 and 1781, and probably of the original Roman Pons Aelius bridge.

The previous bridge on the site was demolished in 1868 to enable larger ships to move upstream to William Armstrong's works. The hydraulic Swing Bridge was designed and paid for by Armstrong, with work beginning in 1873.  It was first used for road traffic on 15 June 1876 and opened for river traffic on 17 July 1876.  At the time of construction it was the largest swing bridge ever built.  The construction cost was £240,000.

The hydraulic power still used to move the bridge is today derived from electrically driven pumps. These feed a hydraulic accumulator sunk into a  shaft below the bridge; the water is then released under pressure which runs the machinery to turn the bridge. The mechanism used for this is still the same machinery originally installed by Armstrong. It has an  cantilevered span with a central axis of rotation able to move through 360° to allow vessels to pass on either side of it.

The busiest year of operation was 1924 when the bridge was rotated 6,000 times unlike current use where it is only required to turn occasionally to allow yachts and pleasure craft to pass by and on the first Wednesday of each month as a maintenance exercise. 
The bridge featured in the final episode and climax of the educational series Geordie Racer from Look and Read, when the villains became stranded on the bridge after a robbery. In May 2016, a fire broke out on the pontoon under the bridge. Around  was affected by the blaze which was tackled by two fire crews and a fire boat. The bridge was renovated in 2018 at a cost of £200,000. The restoration involved 25,000 hours of work and 10,000 screws were used in repairs. Its reopening in August 2021 was marred by technical issues which saw the bridge unable to swing.

References

External links

Swing bridges in England
Bridges in Tyne and Wear
Grade II* listed buildings in Tyne and Wear
Buildings and structures in Newcastle upon Tyne
Bridges completed in 1876
Crossings of the River Tyne
Transport in Newcastle upon Tyne
Grade II* listed bridges in England